Madeleine Gustafsson, formerly Madeleine Grundström (born 1980) is a Swedish handball goalkeeper who plays for the Sweden women's national handball team. She participated at the 2008 Summer Olympics in Beijing, where Sweden placed 8th. She was listed among the top ten goalkeepers at the 2008 European Women's Handball Championship in Macedonia.

References

External links

1980 births
Living people
People from Eskilstuna
Swedish female handball players
Olympic handball players of Sweden
Handball players at the 2008 Summer Olympics
Sportspeople from Södermanland County